Aloísio Pires Alves (born 16 August 1963), known simply as Aloísio, is a Brazilian retired footballer who played as a central defender.

He spent 11 of his 19 years as a professional with Porto, appearing in 474 competitive games with the club and winning 19 major titles.

Club career
Aloísio was born in Pelotas, Rio Grande do Sul. He represented local Sport Club Internacional in his country, helping the Porto Alegre side to three state leagues and the second position in the 1987 edition of the Série A, named Copa União in that year.

In 1988, Aloísio moved to Spain and joined La Liga giants FC Barcelona. Never an undisputed starter whilst in Catalonia, he did feature regularly as the teams before the emergence of the Dream Team won one Copa del Rey – a 2–0 win against Real Madrid– and the 1988–89 European Cup Winners' Cup, with the player starting in the final of the latter against U.C. Sampdoria (2–0).

After two seasons with Barça, Aloísio signed for FC Porto in Portugal, where he would remain for the following 11 years until his retirement. With the exception of his final season he never appeared in less than 28 matches in the Primeira Liga, being one of only five club players to win five consecutive national championships.

Aloísio retired from football in June 2001 at nearly 38 years of age, having won seven leagues, five cups and seven supercups with his main club and appearing in more than 400 official matches. Having begun working under him in January 2002, he was part of José Mourinho's coaching staff in the 2003–04 campaign as Porto won both the domestic and the UEFA Champions League; after one more year, now as assistant to Spaniard Víctor Fernández, he was appointed head coach of the reserve team in the third division.

International career
During 1988, Aloísio earned six caps for Brazil. Also in that year he helped the Olympic team win silver at the Summer Olympic Games, in Seoul.

Career statistics

Club
Appearances and goals by club, season and competition.

Honours
Internacional
Campeonato Gaúcho: 1982, 1983, 1984

Barcelona
Copa del Rey: 1989–90
UEFA Cup Winners' Cup: 1988–89

Porto
Primeira Divisão: 1991–92, 1992–93, 1994–95, 1995–96, 1996–97, 1997–98, 1998–99
Taça de Portugal: 1990–91, 1993–94, 1997–98, 1999–00, 2000–01
Supertaça Cândido de Oliveira: 1990, 1991, 1993, 1994, 1996, 1998, 1999

Brazil U20
FIFA World Youth Championship: 1983
South American Youth Championship: 1983

Brazil
Summer Olympic Games: Silver Medal 1988

Individual
Bola de Prata: 1987

References

External links

1963 births
Living people
Sportspeople from Rio Grande do Sul
Brazilian footballers
Association football defenders
Campeonato Brasileiro Série A players
Sport Club Internacional players
La Liga players
FC Barcelona players
Primeira Liga players
FC Porto players
Brazil under-20 international footballers
Brazil international footballers
Footballers at the 1988 Summer Olympics
Olympic footballers of Brazil
Olympic silver medalists for Brazil
Olympic medalists in football
Medalists at the 1988 Summer Olympics
Brazilian expatriate footballers
Expatriate footballers in Spain
Expatriate footballers in Portugal
Brazilian expatriate sportspeople in Spain
Brazilian expatriate sportspeople in Portugal
Brazilian football managers
Brazilian expatriate football managers
Expatriate football managers in Portugal
FC Porto B managers
FC Porto non-playing staff